The bulk modulus ( or ) of a substance is a measure of the resistance of a substance to compression. It is defined as the ratio of the infinitesimal pressure increase to the resulting relative decrease of the volume.

Other moduli describe the material's response (strain) to other kinds of stress: the shear modulus describes the response to shear stress, and Young's modulus describes the response to normal (lengthwise stretching) stress.  For a fluid, only the bulk modulus is meaningful.  For a complex anisotropic solid such as wood or paper, these three moduli do not contain enough information to describe its behaviour, and one must use the full generalized Hooke's law. The reciprocal of the bulk modulus at fixed temperature is called the isothermal compressibility.

Definition
The bulk modulus  (which is usually positive) can be formally defined by the equation

where  is pressure,  is the initial volume of the substance, and  denotes the derivative of pressure with respect to volume.  Since the volume is inversely proportional to the density, it follows that 

where  is the initial density and  denotes the derivative of pressure with respect to density. The inverse of the bulk modulus gives a substance's compressibility. Generally the bulk modulus is defined at constant temperature as the isothermal bulk modulus, but can also be defined at constant entropy as the adiabatic bulk modulus.

Thermodynamic relation
Strictly speaking, the bulk modulus is a thermodynamic quantity, and in order to specify a bulk modulus it is necessary to specify how the pressure varies during compression: constant-temperature (isothermal ), constant-entropy (isentropic ), and other variations are possible. Such distinctions are especially relevant for gases.

For an ideal gas, an isentropic process has:

where  is the heat capacity ratio. Therefore, the isentropic bulk modulus  is given by

Similarly, an isothermal process of an ideal gas has:

Therefore, the isothermal bulk modulus  is given by

 .

When the gas is not ideal, these equations give only an approximation of the bulk modulus. In a fluid, the bulk modulus  and the density  determine the speed of sound  (pressure waves), according to the Newton-Laplace formula

In solids,  and  have very similar values. Solids can also sustain transverse waves: for these materials one additional elastic modulus, for example the shear modulus, is needed to determine wave speeds.

Measurement 
It is possible to measure the bulk modulus using  powder diffraction under applied pressure.
It is a property of a fluid which shows its ability to change its volume under its pressure.

Selected values

A material with a bulk modulus of 35 GPa loses one percent of its volume when subjected to an external pressure of 0.35 GPa (~) (assumed constant or weakly pressure dependent bulk modulus).

Microscopic origin

Interatomic potential and linear elasticity 

Since linear elasticity is a direct result of interatomic interaction, it is related to the extension/compression of bonds. It can then be derived from the interatomic potential for crystalline materials. First, let us examine the potential energy of two interacting atoms. Starting from very far points, they will feel an attraction towards each other. As they approach each other, their potential energy will decrease. On the other hand, when two atoms are very close to each other, their total energy will be very high due to repulsive interaction. Together, these potentials guarantee an interatomic distance that achieves a minimal energy state. This occurs at some distance a0, where the total force is zero:

Where U is interatomic potential and r is the interatomic distance. This means the atoms are in equilibrium.

To extend the two atoms approach into solid, consider a simple model, say, a 1-D array of one element with interatomic distance of a, and the equilibrium distance is a0. Its potential energy-interatomic distance relationship has similar form as the two atoms case, which reaches minimal at a0, The Taylor expansion for this is:

At equilibrium, the first derivative is 0, so the dominate term is the quadratic one. When displacement is small, the higher order terms should be omitted. The expression becomes:

Which is clearly linear elasticity.

Note that the derivation is done considering two neighboring atoms, so the Hook's coefficient is:

This form can be easily extended to 3-D case, with volume per atom(Ω) in place of interatomic distance.

Relationship with atomic radius 
As derived above, the bulk modulus is directly related the interatomic potential and volume per atoms. We can further evaluate the interatomic potential to connect K with other properties. Usually, the interatomic potential can be expressed as a function of distance that has two terms, one term for attraction and another term for repulsion.

Where A > 0 represents the attraction term and B > 0 represents repulsion. n and m are usually integral, and m is usually larger than n, which represents short range nature of repulsion. At equilibrium position, u is at its minimal, so first order derivative is 0.

when r is close to, recall that the n (usually 1 to 6) is smaller than m (usually 9 to 12), ignore the second term, evaluate the second derivative

Recall the relationship between r and Ω

In many cases, such as in metal or ionic material, the attraction force is electrostatic, so n = 1, we have

This applies to atoms with similar bonding nature. This relationship is verified within alkali metals and many ionic compounds.

See also 
 Elasticity tensor

References

Further reading

Elasticity (physics)
Physical quantities